The Isle of Man Office of Fair Trading is an independent Statutory Board of the Isle of Man Government. The purpose of the office is to enforce criminal consumer protection legislation and advice on civil consumer legislation however the office cannot enforce civil legislation. Such legislation provides consumers with certain rights when purchasing goods and services and these rights can ultimately only be enforced by the consumer through the Courts. Unsatisfactory goods and services, breaches of contracts for goods and services are examples of matters covered by civil legislation.

Chairmen
Martyn Perkins, 2016-
David Quirk, 2011-2016
Robert Henderson, 2008-2011
Quintin Gill MHK, 2004-2008
John Houghton MHK, 1999-2004
Pamela Crowe MLC, 1997-2002

References

External links
 http://www.gov.im/oft/

Government of the Isle of Man
Economy of the Isle of Man
Manx law
Consumer organisations in the United Kingdom